401st may refer to:

401st Air Expeditionary Group, provisional United States Air Force unit assigned to the United States Air Forces in Europe
401st Air Expeditionary Wing, inactive unit of the United States Air Force
401st Army Field Support Brigade, forward support brigade of the United States Army
401st Brigade, an armored unit of the Israeli Defence Forces
401st Squadron (disambiguation), several military units

See also
401 (number)
401 (disambiguation)
401, the year 401 (CDI) of the Julian calendar
401 BC